The 1962 Australian Drivers' Championship was a CAMS sanctioned motor racing title for drivers of Formula Libre racing cars. The winner of the title, which was the sixth Australian Drivers' Championship, was awarded the 1962 CAMS Gold Star.

Schedule
The championship was contested over a six race series.
Race 1, South Pacific International Race, Longford, Tasmania, 5 March
Race 2, Craven Filter Bathurst 100, Mount Panorama Circuit, Bathurst, New South Wales, 23 April
Race 3, Queensland Road Racing Championship, Lowood, Queensland, 3 June
Race 4, Victorian Road Racing Championship, Sandown Park, Victoria, 16 September
Race 5, Gold Star Scratch Race, Mallala, South Australia, 8 October
Race 6, Australian Grand Prix, Caversham, Western Australia, 3 November

Points system
Championship points were awarded on a 12-7-5-3-2-1 basis for the six best placed Australian license holders. Each driver could count his/her results from the Australian Grand Prix plus the best four results from the remaining races. Ties in the award were determined by the relevant drivers placings in the Australian Grand Prix.

Results

Note:
 Patterson was awarded third place in the championship due to his superior placing in the Australian Grand Prix.
 English driver John Surtees (Cooper T53 Coventry Climax FPF) was not awarded points for his victory in the Longford race
 New Zealand driver Angus Hyslop (Cooper T53 Coventry Climax FPF) was not awarded points for his fourth place in the Longford race
 New Zealand driver Bruce McLaren (Cooper T62 Coventry Climax FPF) was not awarded points for his victory in the Australian Grand Prix

References

Further reading
 Jim Sheperd, A History of Australian Motor Sport, 1980
 John Blanden, Historic Racing Cars in Australia, 1979
 The official 50-race history of the Australian Grand Prix, 1986
 Surtees wins fast Longford International, Australian Motor Sports, May 1962, page 23
 David McKay, Stillwell's Day, Modern Motor, July 1962, pages 30–32 & 77-78
 Gold Star at Lowood, Modern Motor, August 1962, page 75
 David McKay, "Davo" at Sandown, Modern Motor, November 1962
 David McKay, 'Star' to Bib, Modern Motor, December 1962, page 28

External links
 CAMS Online Manual of Motor Sport
 www.oldracingcars.com

Australian Drivers' Championship
Drivers' Championship